Planetary means relating to a planet or planets.  It can also refer to:

Science
 Planetary habitability, the measure of an astronomical body's potential to develop and sustain life
 Planetary nebula, an astronomical object

People
 Planetary (rapper), one half of east coast rap group OuterSpace

Arts, entertainment, and media
 Planetary (comics), a comic book series by Warren Ellis and John Cassaday
 "Planetary (Go!)", a 2011 song by rock band My Chemical Romance
 Planetary Radio, a public radio show about space exploration, produced by The Planetary Society

Organizations
 The Planetary Society, the Earth's largest space interest group

Technology
 Epicyclic gearing (planetary gearing), an automotive transmission technology
 Planetary scanner - type of image scanner for making scans of rare books with mounted camera taking photos